The Birth is the debut studio album by American rock band Stardeath and White Dwarfs.

Track listing

References

2009 debut albums
Albums produced by Greg Kurstin
Warner Records albums
Stardeath and White Dwarfs albums